This is a list of the speakers of the House of Commons of England, up to 1707.

For speakers of the House of Commons of Great Britain from 1707 to 1800 and of the House of Commons of the United Kingdom from 1801, see List of speakers of the British House of Commons.

List of parlours or prolocutors before 1377

Before 1377, the Speaker was referred to by terms such as the parlour and the prolocutor. Some of them presided, and Peter de Montfort and Peter de la Mare were certainly presiding officers of the Commons. The others named in this section were spokesmen. Some of them held judicial offices. It is not certain that they presided over the Commons.

The date given is that of the first meeting of the Parliament in question. Only Parliaments for which a presiding officer is known or supposed are included in the table. 

 Source: Laundy The Office of Speaker

Speakers of the House of Commons of England from 1377 to 1707

Source: Laundy The Office of Speaker

For speakers of the House of Commons of Great Britain from 1707 to 1800 and of the House of Commons of the United Kingdom from 1801, see List of speakers of the British House of Commons.

Notes

External links

 List
English House of Commons